is a kaiju who first appeared in Toho's 2000 film Godzilla vs. Megaguirus. A mutated version of the fictional , Megaguirus is regarded as the queen of the species; according to Toho, she is 50 meters (164 feet) long, has a wingspan of 80 meters (262 feet) and weighs 12,000 metric tons (13,227 short tons). The first and only major appearance of the creature was in the 2000 film Godzilla vs. Megaguirus, she also had a brief cameo appearance in Godzilla: Final Wars from 2004.

Overview
Although the species of Meganulon, the origin of Megaguirus, were first depicted in the 1956 movie Rodan, the monster itself did not appear until its debut in 2000. Megaguirus was first mentioned in the movie Godzilla vs. Megaguirus after a swarm of Meganulon absorbed energy from Godzilla and quickly fled to a flooded section of Tokyo. After diving into the flood waters, the entire swarm latched on to an enormous, mutated version of Meganulon. This mutated creature, regarded as the queen, begins to molt once enough energy had been obtained. After leaving behind her exoskeleton, Megaguirus rose above the water's surface and entered the skies of Tokyo.

Immediately after getting above water, Megaguirus began her rampage across Tokyo, destroying numerous buildings by creating supersonic shock waves with her wings. The Japanese military, already deployed to the city to assist in evacuating residents caught in the flood, was helpless to stop Megaguirus. In addition to being practically immune to bullets, her wings emitted a piercing buzz which forced people to stop what they were doing and cover their ears in pain. Before leaving the city, the creature leveled a skyscraper and caused a chain reaction of explosions in several other buildings near where she was born. Several days later, Megaguirus returned to Tokyo in pursuit of Godzilla.

Moments before Megaguirus's second arrival in Tokyo, the G-Graspers, a legion of anti-Godzilla soldiers in the Japan Self Defense Unit, attempts to take down Godzilla "once and for all." However, Megaguirus interrupts this and begins a lengthy duel with Godzilla. Initially, Megaguirus takes Godzilla by surprise, using her speed to avoid Godzilla's attacks, including his atomic breath, as well as knock him over multiple times. Eventually, Megaguirus grabs onto Godzilla's neck with her vice-like claws. Although Godzilla breaks free of the grasp and begins to charge up his atomic breath, Megaguirus jabs Godzilla with her stinger and begins absorbing energy, preventing Godzilla from using his atomic breath while giving more power to Megaguirus.

Megaguirus uses her newly obtained energy to pick Godzilla up and throw him into a building. Once Godzilla recovers, Megaguirus again stabs him with her stinger, but this time, Godzilla grabs Megaguirus's tail and slams it into the ground and follows through by tackling her. Shortly thereafter, Megaguirus uses the absorbed energy to launch an "atomic blast" which causes Godzilla to collapse. Seemingly having defeated Godzilla, Megaguirus goes in for the kill, but just as she makes her move, Godzilla quickly gets up and bites off Megaguirus's stinger. Stunned, Megaguirus floats backwards from Godzilla, only to be set aflame by his atomic breath. To ensure his victory, Godzilla hits Megaguirus again, causing her to explode into a ball of fire before the burning remains fell to the ground and exploded for a final time.

Megaguirus make a brief appearance in the prequel novel of Godzilla: Planet of the Monsters, Godzilla: Monster Apocalypse. The Megaguiruses took over Siberia, often clashed with the Rodans, preying on the European refugees on the Trans-Siberian Railway.

Meganulon 
Megaguirus is the queen of a race of giant prehistoric dragonfly kaiju called , also dubbed , which first appeared in Toho's 1956 film Rodan.

Abilities
Similar to nearly every monster in the Godzilla series, Megaguirus was at one point exposed to radioactive materials, resulting in a substantial increase in strength, speed and size. After obtaining energy from the minor Meganulon, Megaguirus is able to fly at incredibly fast speeds, up to mach 5. It is able to flap its dragonfly-like wings at super-sonic speeds, creating shock waves that can destroy buildings. Its enlarged tail works similar to the stinger of a scorpion, it jabs its foe and latches on to it. Once the stinger is in Megaguirus's opponent, it can either absorb energy for itself or release a blast of energy composed of its opponent's beam weapon. Additionally, while flying, its wings cause electronic disturbances.

Appearances

Films
 Rodan (1956)
 Godzilla vs. Megaguirus (2000) 
 Godzilla: Final Wars (2004 - stock footage cameo)

Video games
 Godzilla: Save the Earth (Xbox, PS2 - 2004)
 Godzilla: Unleashed (Wii, PS2 - 2007)
 Godzilla Unleashed: Double Smash (NDS - 2007)
 Godzilla Defense Force (2019)

Literature
 Godzilla: Rulers of Earth (comic - 2013-2015)
 Godzilla: Cataclysm (comic - 2014)

References

Fictional characters who can move at superhuman speeds
Fictional characters with superhuman strength
Fictional insects
Godzilla characters
Toho monsters
Science fiction film characters
Fantasy film characters
Film characters introduced in 2000
Fictional mutants
Kaiju
Fictional monsters
Horror film villains